HMS Tamar was the name for the British Royal Navy's base in Hong Kong from 1897 to 1997. It took its name from HMS Tamar, a ship that was used as the base until replaced by buildings ashore.

History

19th century
The British Navy arrived during the First Opium War to protect the opium traders. Sir Edward Belcher, aboard HMS Sulphur landed in Hong Kong on 25 January 1841. Possession Street still exists to mark the event, although its Chinese name is 水坑口街 ("Mouth of the ditch Street").

 
Commodore Sir Gordon Bremer raised the Union Jack and claimed Hong Kong as a colony on 26 January 1841. Naval store sheds were erected there in April 1841. The site had been referred to as the "HM Victualling Yard" in the Navy's own register. The first naval storekeeper and agent victualler, Thomas McKnight, appointed on 21 March 1842, served until October 1849. Early maps show that major construction was also carried out at another, slightly more westward site, between 1845 and 1855. In fact, the naval authorities demolished the West Point store sheds and surrendered the land to the colonial government in 1854 in exchange for a plot of land where the Admiralty station of the Mass Transit Railway stands.

The Second Opium War in China (1856–1860) caused a military build-up, in which the yard expanded westwards in April 1858. A victualling yard was added at what was then the North Barracks. Two officers were initially appointed as responsible for the machinery and spare parts, respectively, needed to maintain and repair ships in the dockyard, and for dry goods and foodstuff in the victualling yard.

HMS Tamar, was a 3,650 ton British troopship laid down in 1862 and launched in 1863. She first visited Hong Kong in 1878 with reliefs crews, returned once in 1886. She finally arrived in Victoria City on 11 April 1897. She was stationed permanently in the harbour from 1897 to 1941, when she was scuttled during the Battle of Hong Kong during World War II, to avoid being used by the invading Japanese Imperial forces.

20th century

 
At the turn of the 20th century, land adjacent to the site was needed for expansion. Unable to obtain it, as the site was surrounded by army barracks, the Navy began work on the construction of a floating basin (sheltered bay) and the reclamation of the east arm of the dockyard, in 1902. This project, involving 160,000 square metres of land reclamation, a 36,000 square metre floating basin to repair and refit vessels afloat, and also a 183-metre graving dock, was completed by 1908.

At the end of World War II, the Royal Navy re-established their naval base at Wellington Barracks, vacated by the British Army.

On 28 November 1957, the Navy announced that the dockyard would be closed down over a 2-year period. However, in 1959, the Navy, which had retained some land on the waterfront, began planning a compact naval base on the site.

From 1959 to 1962, the Wellington Barracks were upgraded to better serve the colony and reflect the changing times for the Royal Navy in the Pacific region. Old naval buildings were demolished, and the rubble used as landfill for the reclamation of the dry dock in October 1959.

The Royal Navy decided to demolish the Wellington Barracks and build a modern naval facility in Hong Kong. The Prince of Wales Building was completed in 1978 and became the headquarters of the new naval base, HMS Tamar.

Shortly before the departure of British forces in 1997, the Tamar basin was reclaimed, and the People's Liberation Army of the People's Republic of China occupied the Prince of Wales Building (now Chinese People's Liberation Army Forces Hong Kong Building, or collectively with other buildings and the area enclosed by walls, the Central Barracks).

HM Naval Base was relocated to the northern side of Stonecutter's Island, off Kowloon, prior to the handover in 1997. On 11 April 1997, just over a hundred years since HMS Tamar's definitive arrival for service as a base depot ship (the Tamar had arrived in Hong Kong for conversion on 30 September 1895) and just under a century after her commissioning on 1 October 1897, the British naval shore establishment in Hong Kong was de-commissioned.

The last HMS Tamar on Stonecutters Island is now a government marine facility, now known as the Government Dockyard. The vacated site in Central, Hong Kong Central, now known as the Tamar site, became a valuable piece of real estate and after much debate as to how to best use the site has now become the location of the new Hong Kong Government's Central Government Complex.

Administration

Commodore-in-Charge, Hong Kong
Post holders included:
 Commodore Oliver J. Jones: March 1866 – December 1869
 Commodore John A.P. Price: December 1869 – September 1870
 Commodore Francis H. Shortt: September 1870 – August 1873
 Commodore John E. Parish: August 1873 – March 1876
 Commodore George W. Watson: March 1876 – March 1879
 Commodore Thomas E. Smith: March 1879 – May 1881
 Commodore William H. Cuming: May 1881 – February 1884
 Commodore George Digby Morant: February 1884 – February 1887
 Commodore William H. Maxwell: February 1887 – December 1888
 Commodore Edmund J. Church: December 1888 – December 1891
 Commodore Henry St.L. Bury Palliser: December 1891 – June 1893
 Commodore George T.H. Boyes: June 1893 – July 1896
 Commodore Swinton C. Holland: July 1896 – March 1899
 Commodore Francis Powell: March 1899 – March 1902
 Commodore Charles G. Robinson: March 1902 – February 1904
 Commodore Charles Gauntlett Dicken: February 1904 – September 1905
 Commodore Hugh P. Williams: September 1905 – April 1907
 Commodore Robert H.S. Stokes: April 1907 – October 1908
 Commodore Herbert Lyon: October 1908 – July 1910
 Commodore Cresswell J. Eyres: July 1910 – July 1912
 Rear-Admiral Robert H. Anstruther: July 1912 – May 1916 (as Rear-Admiral-in-Charge, Hong Kong)
 Commodore Henry G.G. Sandeman: May 1916 – May 1918
 Commodore Victor G. Gurner: May 1918 – June 1920
 Commodore William Bowden-Smith: June 1920 – June 1922
 Commodore Henry E. Grace: June 1922 – October 1924
 Commodore Anselan J.B.Stirling: October 1924 – November 1926
 Commodore John L. Pearson: November 1926 – October 1928
 Commodore Richard A. S. Hill: October 1928 – November 1930
 Commodore Arthur H. Walker: November 1930 – August 1932
 Commodore Edward McC. W. Lawrie: August 1932 – June 1933
 Commodore Frank Elliott: July 1933 – April 1935
 Commodore Cyril G.Sedgwick: April 1935 – April 1937
 Commodore Edward B.C.Dicken: April 1937 – April 1939
 Commodore Arthur M. Peters: April 1939 – November 1940 (as Commodore-in-Charge, Naval Establishments, Hong Kong)
 Commodore Alfred C. Collinson: November 1940 – December 1941
 Commodore Douglas H. Everett: August 1945 – June 1947
 Commodore Charles L. Robertson: June 1947 – June 1949
 Commodore Leslie N. Brownfield: June 1949 – July 1951 
 Commodore Harold G. Dickinson: July 1951 – July 1953
 Commodore Anthony H. Thorold: July 1953 – June 1955
 Commodore John H. Unwin: June 1955 – March 1957
 Commodore G. David A. Gregory: March 1957 – April 1960
 Commodore Adrian R.L. Butler: April 1960 – October 1962
 Commodore George O.Symonds: November 1962 – February 1965
 Commodore Frank D. Holford: February 1965 – January 1967
 Commodore Thomas H.P. Wilson: January 1967 – October 1968
 Commodore Philip R.C. Higham: October 1968 – July 1970
 Commodore Roger E.S. Wykes-Sneyd: July 1970 – August 1972
 Commodore John K. Stevens: August 1972 – August 1973
 Commodore John A.G. Evans: August 1973 – October 1975

Captain-in-Charge, Hong Kong
Post holders included:
 Captain Richard L. Garnons-Williams: October 1975 – March 1978
 Captain Robert W. Moland: March 1978 – June 1980
 Captain Andrew A. Waugh: June 1980 – June 1982
 Captain Frederick A. Collins: June 1982 – March 1985
 Captain Christopher W. Gotto: March 1985 – July 1987
 Captain Peter Dalrymple-Smith: July 1987 – January 1990
 Captain Michael C. Gordon Lennox: January 1990 – 1992
 Captain Thomas L.M. Sunter: 1992–1994
 Captain Peter J. Melson: 1994–1995
 Captain Andrew K. Steele: 1995–1996

Squadrons in Hong Kong
The following is a list of naval squadrons and fleets that called Tamar home:
 China Squadron 1844–1941, 1945–1992
 Far East Fleet/HK Sqdn 1969–1971
 Dragon Squadron 1971–1992
 3 Raiding Royal Marines
 Hong Kong Royal Naval Volunteer Reserves 1967–1996; merged with Royal Naval Reserve (RNR) 1971
 LEP 1905–1996
 Dragon Squadron
 120th Minesweeping Squadron 1958–1966; transferred to Singapore
 6th Mine Countermeasure Squadron 1969–1997
 6th Patrol Craft Squadron 1970–1997
 Operations and Training Base 1934–1997
 3 Commando Brigade Royal Marines
 47 Royal Marines
 British Pacific Fleet 1840s–1948; to Singapore as Far East Station
 HK Flotilla 1840s–1941, 1948–1992
 China Station – 4th Submarine Flotilla, Yangtse Flotilla, West River Flotilla, 8th Destroyer Flotilla
 5th Cruiser Squadron
 1st Escort Flotilla
 4th Frigate Flotilla ?–1952
 Frigate Squadron 1952–1976
 Light Cruiser Squadron
 415 Maritime Troop
 Naval Party 1009 (Hovercraft Unit)

Naval facilities

A list of facilities used or built by the Royal Navy in Hong Kong:
 Prince of Wales Building 1978–1997; now Central Barracks of the PLA
 Lamont and Hope Drydocks
 Aberdeen Docks – destroyed
 Dry Dock 1902–1959
 Taikoo Dockyard – Hong Kong United Dockyards
 Royal Navy Dockyards 1902–1959
 Sai Wan Barracks 1844–1846
 Wellington Barracks 1946–1978, as HMS Tamar (demolished)
 North Barracks 1850s–1856, 1887–1959; from the Army and to HK Government 1959
 Victoria Barracks
 Redoubt and Lei Yue Mun Fortifications 1885–1887
 Lei Yue Mun Fort 1887–1987
 Reverse, Central, West and Pass Batteries 1880s
 Brennan Torpedo station 1890 – Lei Yue Mun
 Royal Naval Hospital, Wan Chai; now Ruttonjee Sanatorium
 Seaman's Hospital 1843–1873; replaced by Royal Naval Hospital
 RMS Queen Mary 1945–1946, as a hospital
 War Memorial Hospital (Matilda) 1946–1959
 British Military Hospital 1959–1995
 Island Group Practice 1995–1997, replaced British Military Hospital
 HMS Charlotte and HMS Victor Emmanuel – Receiving Ships
 Tidal Basin 1902–1959
 Boat Basin 1902–1959
 HM Victualling Yards 1859–1946

A list of facilities used or built by the Royal Navy in Hong Kong:
 Guard Room
 Chichester Block
 Aberdeen Docks
 Royal Naval Hospital, Wan Chai; now Ruttonjee Sanatorium
 Seaman's Hospital 1843–1873
 HMS Tamar – Receiving ship 1897–1941
 HMS Minden 1841–mid-1840s – hospital ship
 HMS Alligator 1840s–1865 – hospital ship
 HMS Melville 1860s–1873 – hospital ship (East Indies Sqdn)

Ships
 Duty Boats – including Victoria
 RN Ferry (T-boats such as:Ah Moy) Numbers as T1. T2 etc. To ferry service personnels across Victoria Harbour, with Three stops, HMS Tamar (Admirialty), Stoncutter Island (British Military Base), Kowloon Public Pier.

See also 
 British Forces Overseas Hong Kong
 HMNB Singapore
 People's Liberation Army Hong Kong Garrison
 Ngong Shuen Chau Naval Base
 RM Tamar

References

Further reading

Military of Hong Kong under British rule
Royal Navy bases outside the United Kingdom
Central, Hong Kong
Battle of Hong Kong
World War II sites in Hong Kong

zh:添馬艦 (香港)